Jung Eui-chul (born April 19, 1985) is a South Korean model and actor.

Career 
He made his acting debut in the drama Biscuit Teacher and Star Candy as a student and gained positive response in 2005 and later landed on many supporting roles including the award-winning films such as Five Senses of Eros and popularity based novel film Do Re Mi Fa So La Ti Do. 
Through his connection with actress model Kei Nangon he was signed under the same management; Clumsy Media in 2011. According to news reports they met during the final auditions for Boys Over Flowers. In the following year, he secured his Korean fan base playing as a cold attitude popular student in high school in the ratings hit drama Flower Band.

Filmography

Dramas
Vampire Prosecutor - cameo appearance (OCN, 2012)
Flower Band (tvN, 2012)
Boys Over Flowers (KBS2, 2009)
Rainbow Romance (MBC, 2006)
Biscuit Teacher and Star Candy (SBS, 2005)

Movies
Yeosu (2011)
Closer to Heaven (2009)
Five Senses of Eros (2009)
Romantic Island (2008)
The Moonlight of Seoul (2008)
Do Re Mi Fa So La Ti Do (2008)

External links
Jung Eui-chul at Cyworld
Jung Eui-chul at Nate

References 

South Korean male models
1985 births
Living people
South Korean male television actors
South Korean male film actors
Konkuk University alumni